Last of the Living is a 2009 New Zealand comedy-horror film written and directed by Logan McMillan.

Plot

A contagious virus has spread throughout the land turning everybody who is bitten into zombies. Morgan, Ash, and Johnny believe they are the only humans left, and spend their time lounging in mansions playing video games. When they stumble upon scientist Stef who claims to have a cure, the three of them decide to help save mankind whilst trying to each win her affections.

Cast

 Morgan Williams as Morgan
 Robert Faith as Johnny
 Ashleigh Southam as Ash
 Emily Paddon-Brown as Stef
 Mark Hadlow as Dad

External links
 
 

2009 films
2009 horror films
New Zealand comedy horror films
New Zealand zombie films
2009 comedy horror films
Zombie comedy films
2009 comedy films
2000s English-language films